The Ethiopian National Educational Assessment and Examination Agency (NEAEA)  is a government agency responsible for conducting and inspection of national exam for grade 10th and 12th. It was established by Council of Ministers under Proclamation No.260/2012. Its office is located in King George VI Street, in Arada district of Addis Ababa.

Task
National Educational Assessment and Examination Agency (NEAEA) is responsible for conduct national exams in Ethiopia for grade 10th and 12th. The Council of Ministers established NEAEA under Proclamation No.260/2012. The Regulation, unless the context otherwise requires: 

1. "national examination" means a nationwide exam which is administered on the basis of the national education and training policy and curricula

2/ "exam adminisiration" includes the process of registration of examinees, preparation. printing, conducting and correction of exam, consolidation of exam results and declaring and cetiying same 

3/ "region" moans any state referred to in Article 47(1) of the Constitution of the Federal Democratic Republic of Ethiopia and includes the Addis Ababa and Dire Dawa city administrations; 

4/ "Ministry" means the Ministry of Education 

5/ any expression in the masculine gender includes the feminine.

Criticism
In March 2022, education office of Amhara Regional Government sent team to the agency by requesting Ministry of Education an explanation about "errors" in the national examination grading. 20,000 complaints have filed against the result of the grade 12 leaving examination, in which the government selects students to join 43 universities across the country. The agency claimed 559 students were affected due to what is called "grading problem", and still not fixed. The region said in North Wollo Zone, 679 students out of 42 schools were affected by these irregularities and failed to university entrance exam.

References

Government ministries of Ethiopia
Education in Ethiopia